Mys is a rural locality (a village) in Kosinskoye Rural Settlement, Kosinsky District, Perm Krai, Russia. The population was 104 as of 2010. There are 4 streets.

Geography 
Mys is located 23 km north of Kosa (the district's administrative centre) by road. Poroshevo is the nearest rural locality.

References 

Rural localities in Kosinsky District